Joshua "Josh" Howatson (born ) is a Canadian male volleyball player. He was part of the Canada men's national volleyball team at the 2010 FIVB Volleyball Men's World Championship in Italy. He played for Team Canada.

Clubs
 Team Canada (2010)

References

1984 births
Living people
Canadian men's volleyball players
Place of birth missing (living people)